Cheltenham Borough Council is the local authority for Cheltenham, which is split into 20 wards, with a total of 40 councillors elected to serve on the borough council. Since 2002, elections have been held every two years with half of the councillors elected at each election. Following the last election in 2022, there were 31 Liberal Democrat members, 6 Conservatives, 2 representing the People Against Bureaucracy group, and 1 from the Green Party, a historical first. On 5 June 2022, Liberal Democrat councillor Wendy Flynn defected to the Green Party. In September 2022, the mayor, councillor Sandra Holliday, was suspended from the Liberal Democrats for 12 months for bullying. She remains in post but non aligned.

History

The district was formed on 1 April 1974 under the Local Government Act 1972, and was redrawn in 1991 with the addition of the areas of Leckhampton, Up Hatherley and Prestbury.

Responsibilities

Cheltenham Borough Council carries out a variety of district council functions including:
Benefits - Housing and Council Tax
Car Parking
Concessionary Travel
Council Tax - Administration and Collection
Elections and Electoral Registration
Environmental Health (includes Domestic and Commercial Premises)
Food Safety and Hygiene Complaints
Noise Pollution and Pest Control
Housing Administration
Licensing
Caravan Sites
Planning, including Planning Applications, Advice and Appeals
Public Conveniences
Health and Leisure Centres
Refuse Collection
Recycling
Tourism and Visitor Information

References

Non-metropolitan district councils of England
Local authorities in Gloucestershire
Politics of Cheltenham